Vladimir Alekseevich Morozov (born May 11, 1958) is a Russian film director and screenwriter, best known for his work in his TV show Evlampiya Romanova. In 1995, Morozov finished at the Russian Institute of Cinematography. He has worked in the film studio "Mosfilm" from 1989. He is now married to actress Alla Kliouka and has three sons and a daughter.

Filmography

Film

Television

References 

Vladimir Morozov on IMDb
Morozov's filmography on kinopoisk.ru

Living people
1958 births
Russian film directors
Russian screenwriters